Maccreanor Lavington is a British architectural design firm with offices in Rotterdam and London, known for its work in housing, public buildings and regeneration.

The firm was formed in 1992 in Rotterdam by architects Gerard Maccreanor and Richard Lavington, and currently employs around 40 architects in London, as well as around 40 architects overseas.

In 2008, Accordia, which was also designed by Alison Brooks Architects and Feilden Clegg Bradley Studios, became the first housing development to win the Royal Institute of British Architects (RIBA) Stirling Prize.

In 2021, Maccreanor Lavington was nominated for Neave Brown Award for its Blackfriars Circus scheme in London. The contract value of the project is £105m. Internal area is 39,467m².

Selected works 

 Accordia, Cambridge
 South Gardens, London
 North West Cambridge development, Cambridge
 Saxon Court & Roseberry Mansions, Kings Cross, London
 Katendrecht, Rotterdam
 Kraaiennest Metro Station, Amsterdam
 One Cartwright Gardens, London

Gallery

References

External links 

 Maccreanor Lavington
 Architects Journal AJ100
Maccreanor Lavington Twitter

Architecture firms based in London
Stirling Prize laureates
Architecture firms of the Netherlands